The Carpet People is a comic fantasy novel by British writer  Terry Pratchett. First published in 1971, it was later re-written by the author when his work became more widespread and well-known. In the Author's Note of the revised edition, published in 1992, Pratchett wrote: "This book had two authors, and they were both the same person."

The Carpet People contains much of the humour and some of the concepts which later became a major part of the Discworld series, as well as parodies of everyday objects from our world. Before creating the Discworld,  Pratchett wrote about two different flat worlds, first in this novel, and then in the novel Strata.

Characters

Glurk, chief of the Munrungs
Snibril, Glurk's younger brother
Pismire, the wise man of the Munrung tribe
Bane, a Dumii general
Brocando, King of the Deftmenes
Fray, a natural phenomenon wreaking havoc on the Carpet
Mouls, a power-hungry species
Wights, who remember the future
Camus Cadmes

Themes
The book explores the conflict between traditions and innovation.  There is an established civilization, complete with bureaucrats, taxes imposed and collected, and permits; there are people who resent the establishment; there is a need for both groups to find common ground in order to save their collective civilization.

References

External links
 The Carpet People at The L-Space Web

1971 British novels
1992 British novels
Novels by Terry Pratchett
British fantasy novels
Fantasy worlds